The 2013 Monte Carlo Rally (formally known as the 81ème Rallye Automobile Monte-Carlo) was a motor racing event for rally cars that was held over four days between 16 and 19 January, and marked the eighty-first running of the Monte Carlo Rally. After the ceremonial start in Monte Carlo, the rally was based in the French town of Valence.

The rally was the first round of the 2013 World Rally Championship season, and marked the fortieth anniversary of the World Rally Championship; the 1973 event was the opening round of the championship in its inaugural season. Thirteen World Rally Car crews were entered in the event, including the defending World Drivers' Champion Sébastien Loeb, prior to the start a six-time winner of the Monte Carlo Rally.

The event was run in difficult conditions, with teams reporting during preparations for the event that the stages were subject to the heaviest snowfalls since the 2000 season. The rally was won by Sébastien Loeb, the seventy-seventh of his career and his seventh victory on the Rallye Monte Carlo. The Volkswagen Polo R WRC scored a podium on its competitive debut in the hands of Sébastien Ogier, with Dani Sordo completing the podium in a Citroën DS3 WRC.

Entry list
Entries for the rally closed on 14 December 2012, and were published one week later. Eighty-four entries were received, with seventy-three teams starting the event. Thirteen World Rally Cars started the event, as did eight entries in the newly formed WRC-2 championship for cars built to Group N and Super 2000 regulations, and three teams eligible to score points in the WRC-3 championship for two-wheel drive cars.

Itinerary
The itinerary for the 2013 rally remained relatively unchanged from previous years. The first day of the rally was made up of four special stages to the south and west of the rally base in Valence. Le Moulinon—Antraigues was the first and longest stage—at —of the rally, and was made up of narrow and twisty roads that climb the Col de la Fayolle, before the road widens for a fast descent. This was followed by Burzet—St. Martial, consisting of a series of long technical sections through a forest that opens up onto narrow roads that are exposed to the prevailing weather conditions. Both stages were contested for a second time later that afternoon. Both Le Moulinon—Antraigues and Burzet—St. Martial were modified from the 2012 route, having been extended slightly.

The second leg of the rally was made up of three stages to the north and west of Valence: Labatie d'Andaure—Lalouvesc, St. Bonnet—St. Julien Molhesabate—St. Bonnet and Lamastre—Gilhoc—Alboussière. Labatie d'Andaure—Lalouvesc was characterised by a long climb up the mountainside that became increasingly technical as it went on. St. Bonnet—St. Julien Molhesabate—St. Bonnet both started and finished in the commune of St. Bonnet, encircling a valley with fast, open roads at high altitude. Finally, Lamastre—Gilhoc—Alboussière was a fast and narrow descent that levelled out halfway through as it wound through open farmland. As with the first day of the rally, these three stages were contested twice; once in the morning and again in the afternoon. Similarly, the stages had all minor adjustments from the 2012 route.

This leg of the rally also featured the most changes to the route. The Cimetiere de Vassieux—Col de Gaudissart and Montauban-sur-l'Ouvèze—Eygalayes stages that have been used in recent years were not contested in 2012; instead, the cars travelled east and south of Valence for the St. Jean-en-Royans—La Cime Du Mas stage, which follows a difficult route across the contours of three mountain peaks. Although a regular feature of the rally route, the 2012 route used a version of St. Jean-en-Royans—La Cime Du Mas that had not been featured since 1997. The cars returned to Valence for repairs at midday before contesting St. Nazaire le Desert—La Motte Chalancon and Sisteron—Thoard in the afternoon, both of which returned to the event after an extended absence. St. Nazaire le Desert—La Motte Chalancon was last used in 2009 as a round of the Intercontinental Rally Challenge when it was run in the opposite direction to the planned route for 2012, which follows narrow, twisty roads across a mountain ridge, passing through several small villages as it reaches a mountain pass over a kilometre above sea level. Sisteron—Thoard had not featured in the route since 2002, featuring  of difficult mountain climbs, undulating technical sequences and fast, open stretches at higher altitudes.

The fourth and final leg of the rally was made up of five stages. This formed the longest overall day of competition, with the stages in the Provence-Alpes-Côte d'Azur region, close to the Italian border. The first of these stages, Moulinet—La Bollene Vesubie (also known as the Col de Turini) was contested three times; twice in the afternoon, and once at night. The stage is famous for its endless series of hairpin bends, and steep inclines throughout the stage. The second stage, Lantosque—Lucéram, was also run twice across relatively flat terrain before climbing over a mountain ridge and descending to the commune of Lucéram. The second running of the stage formed the "Power Stage" of the rally. This concept, introduced in 2011, awards bonus World Championship points to the three fastest drivers through the stage.

In detail

Report

Leg 1
The opening stages of the rally presented a challenge to the drivers. Where the first pass through Le Moulinon—Antraigues was mostly dry, the Burzet—St. Martial stage was covered in snow, making tyre choice critical. With the cars running in the order that they finished the 2012 season, Sébastien Loeb was the first driver through the stages, and on his arrival at the end of Le Moulinon—Antraigues it was observed that the dry conditions had torn the studs free of his front tyres. This would become a problem that all of the leading teams would be faced with. Nevertheless, Loeb set the early pace, finishing the stage seventeen seconds ahead of team-mate Mikko Hirvonen and looked unchallenged until Sébastien Ogier set a stage time that was three and a half second faster, giving the Volkswagen Polo R WRC a stage win on the very first stage it contested. Meanwhile, Jari-Matti Latvala in the second Polo R, arrived late at a time control checkpoint before the second stage, and received a thirty-second penalty. Ogier and Loeb maintained their momentum through the snowy Burzet—St. Martial stage, but Loeb took the rally lead from Ogier by seven seconds. Dani Sordo, in the third works-supported Citroën DS3 WRC, retained third place despite a fast time from Juho Hänninen in the Qatar World Rally Team Fiesta RS that saw him pick up two places overall.

Following the service park in Valence, the cars returned to Le Moulinon—Antraigues, where Loeb continued to build on his lead, finishing the stage twelve seconds faster than Latvala, who after some initial teething problems had gained confidence in the Polo R. Sordo was once again third, whilst Hirvonen took fourth back from Hänninen. Ogier finished the stage fifth to be twenty-six and a half seconds behind Loeb. The second pass over Burzet—St. Martial was dry, as the cars had swept the stage of snow during the first run over the stage. The difference was so significant that Loeb set a stage time four minutes faster than the time he recorded in the morning. Hirvonen finished second, some thirty-four seconds slower, to capture third overall from Sordo. Mads Østberg finished the stage third ahead of Ogier, while Latvala finished fifth, recovering to fifth place overall after running as low as ninth during the morning stages. Burzet—St. Martial also claimed the first retirement among the World Rally Cars when Thierry Neuville broke the suspension on his Fiesta RS, coming to a halt less than a kilometre from the spot he retired in 2012.

The opening leg of the rally was also marked by technical troubles in the timing logs, with errors in the system falsely recording Loeb as stopping on the first stage. The problem was rectified when Citroën shut off the Global Positioning System tracking devices installed in the cars driven by Loeb and Dani Sordo, but it was some time before organisers were able to confirm the results at the end of the day. Loeb finished the final stage with a lead of one minute and twenty seconds over Ogier, with Hirvonen third, a further twenty-six seconds behind.

Leg 2
Conditions during the second leg were more consistent than on the first, but considerably colder, with snow recorded on all three stages. Sébastien Ogier recovered five seconds from overnight leader Sébastien Loeb on the first pass through Labatie d'Andaure—Lalouvesc, but team-mate Jari-Matti Latvala struggled once again and lost fifth place to Evgeny Novikov, who went on to set the fastest time through St. Bonnet—St. Julien Molhesabate—St. Bonnet, ahead of Mads Østberg and Juho Hänninen to give Ford the three fastest times of the stage. Novikov took his second stage win on Lamastre—Gilhoc—Alboussiere, while Loeb and Ogier duelled back and forth throughout the morning, taking several seconds away from each other across the three stages. Meanwhile, a difficult day saw Lotos Team WRC's Michał Kościuszko end the first leg in twenty-first position overall, and he spent most of the morning stages recovering, running as high as sixteenth before crashing his Mini John Cooper Works WRC on St. Bonnet—St. Julien Molhesabate—St. Bonnet. Despite extensive damage to the rear of his car, he was able to continue to the midday service.

During the afternoon stages, Loeb won the second pass over Labatie d'Andaure—Lalouvesc and there was no movement among the leading competitors in the overall standings. Juho Hänninen took his maiden stage win on the second running of St. Bonnet—St. Julien Molhesabate—St. Bonnet, six seconds ahead of Novikov who was a further six seconds ahead of Loeb. Loeb and Ogier returned to the top of the timing sheets for the final stage of the leg, the second running of Lamastre—Gilhoc—Alboussiere. Latvala finished third to close within twenty seconds of Hirvonen in fifth overall, whilst Julien Maurin in a privately entered Ford Fiesta RS WRC was forced out when he had an accident on the stage.

Leg 3
Sébastien Loeb won his eighth stage of the rally as the cars resumed the third leg, finishing St. Jean-en-Royans—La Cime du Mas a second and a half faster than Sébastien Ogier, while Evgeny Novikov finished the stage fourth to take a further seven seconds from Dani Sordo. 2011 winner Bryan Bouffier lost over a minute in his privately entered Citroën DS3 WRC when he spun late in the stage, losing eighth place to Mads Østberg, who later took his first stage win at the WRC level on St. Nazaire le Desert—La Motte Chalancon. Novikov finished the stage second, further closing the gap to Sordo, before finally catching him on Sisteron—Thoard. At the end of the leg, Loeb held a lead of one minute and forty-seven seconds over Ogier, who sat a minute and a half ahead of Novikov. Sordo was fourth, less than two seconds behind the Russian, while Jari-Matti Latvala finally felt comfortable with his Polo R WRC, setting the second-fastest time on Sisteron—Thoard and moving up into fifth place overall. Mikko Hirvonen slipped further down the order to sixth place, expressing dissatisfaction with his car, having developed a chronic understeer problem.

Leg 4
The final leg of the rally quickly claimed three scalps during the first pass of the famous Col de Turini stage. Evgeny Novikov crashed halfway through the stage, and despite his efforts to continue, the damage was terminal; Jari-Matti Latvala slid off the road, and was unable to rejoin the route, forcing him out; and Juho Hänninen developed a mechanical problem that brought his Ford Fiesta RS WRC to a halt. Bryan Bouffier was the surprise winner of the stage ahead of Mads Østberg in the sole surviving Fiesta and Sébastien Ogier. With Novikov out, Dani Sordo reclaimed third place and scored his only stage win of the rally on stage fifteen. Further down the order, Michał Kościuszko passed WRC-2 entrant Armin Kremer to move up into the points-scoring positions in tenth, which the Polish driver would hold onto for the remainder of the rally.

Sébastien Loeb won the next stage, which would ultimately prove to be the last of the rally. Following the final service in Monaco, rally organisers decided to cancel the final two stages after they were overwhelmed with spectators. Loeb therefore won the rally, one minute and thirty-nine seconds ahead of Ogier, with Sordo in third. Mikko Hirvonen took fourth, whilst a difficult final stage for Østberg saw him lose fifth place to Bouffier. Martin Prokop took advantage of the retirements early in the day to secure seventh, ahead of Sepp Wiegand in the first of the WRC-2 entries.

WRC-2
Esapekka Lappi established an early lead in the newly created WRC-2 category, but his lead was short-lived when he hit a rock on the first pass through Le Moulinon—Antraigues. Despite setting the fastest time of the stage, his Škoda Fabia S2000 was too badly damaged to continue, and he was forced to retire. He was joined in retirement by Peugeot 207 S2000 driver Luca Betti, who ran off the road on the same stage. Sepp Wiegand, also driving a Škoda Fabia S2000, inherited the lead and held a one-minute advantage over Armin Kremer by the end of the first day. Wiegand consolidated his lead on the second day, extending his lead over Kremer to four minutes when he won all six stages of Leg 2. Wiegand had a scare on the third day, when his battery shorted out on St. Nazaire le Desert—La Motte Chalancon, but he was able to pull over and repair the problem, finishing the day with a lead of nearly five minutes. A late charge from Armin Kremer on the final leg of the rally was not enough to overthrow Wiegand, who won the category and was classified eighth overall. Kremer finished second, with Ukrainian Yuiry Protasov in third.

WRC-3
Three entries were received for the WRC-3 championship, but only two cars started the event when French driver Quentin Gilbert lost his drivers' licence shortly before the event began. Of the two remaining entries, Renaud Poutot in a Citroën DS3 built to R3T regulations established a one-minute lead over Sébastien Chardonnet in another DS3 during the first day. Poutot ended the first day in twentieth position, with Chardonnet in twenty-second and the two separated by Lotos Team WRC driver Michał Kościuszko. Poutot's rally came to an end on stage nine when he slid off the road and into a snowbank. He was unable to get his car started, and retired on the spot, leaving Chardonnet as the sole remaining WRC-3 entry. Needing only to finish to score a full twenty-five points, Chardonnet drove cautiously throughout the remainder of the rally, and was ultimately classified thirteenth overall, forty-five minutes behind rally winner Sébastien Loeb.

Results

Event standings

Notable retirements
Unlike other rallies in the World Championship, the Monte Carlo Rally does not employ "Rally 2" regulations, which allow a retired driver to re-enter the event at the start of the next leg. Because of this, any retirement from the event is permanent.

Special stages

Power stage
The "Power stage" of the rally was to be held on an 18.95 km (11.77 mi) stage between the communes of Lantosque and Lucéram in the region of Provence-Alpes-Côte d'Azur, with additional World Championship points to be awarded to the three fastest drivers. However, the stage was cancelled at the last minute due to overwhelming spectator numbers blocking access to the stage, and no points were awarded.

References

External links 
 
 The official website of the World Rally Championship

Monte Carlo Rally
Monte Carlo Rally
Rally
Monte Carlo